Samuel Angus (27 August 1881 – 17 November 1943) was professor of New Testament and Church History at St Andrew's College in the University of Sydney from 1915–43.

Career

Angus's outspoken views of Christian theology were criticized by the Presbyterian Church of Australia, leading to formal charges of heresy. Angus was later acquitted of these charges after an investigation conducted by the Juridical Commission of the Church.

Angus rejected many of the core traditional Christian beliefs, including the doctrine of the Trinity, the Biblical inspiration, the virgin birth and bodily resurrection of Christ.

Angus earned an M.A. at Queen's College, Galway, and a second M.A. and a PhD from Princeton University. He attended Princeton Theological Seminary, but did not complete a degree. He held a lectureship at Hartford Theological Seminary from 1906 to 1910 and another in Louisville, Kentucky in 1912. Angus served as Visiting Professor of Education at Columbia University from 1929 to 1931.

Works
 Truth and Tradition: a Plea for Practical and Vital Religion and for Reinterpretation of Ancient Theologies, Sydney 1934
The Mystery Religions and Christianity (1925)
The Religious Quests of the Graeco-Roman World: A Study in the Historical Background of Early Christianity (June 1929), Biblo-Moser    
The Sources of the First Ten Books of Augustine's De Civitate Dei (1906)
The Environment of Early Christianity (1914), Studies in Theology C. Scribner ASIN: B00088EPA0 
What Is A Mystery Religion? (?)
Christianity and dogma (1933), Angus & Robertson ASIN: B00088YJZ6 
Forgiveness and life (Posthumously 1962); Chapters from an uncompleted book, "The Historical Approach to Jesus." Publisher: Angus and Robertson ASIN: B0007JN3FS  
The koine: The language of the New Testament (1910) Princeton University Press ASIN: B0008BGFM8 
Man and the new order (1941), Angus and Robertson ASIN: B0007JZWKW 
Religion in national life: Address to the University Association of Canberra, 6 October 1933 ASIN: B00088YJYW 
Alms for oblivion: chapters from a heretic's life (1943), Angus and Robertson

See also
 Henosis
 Gnosis

References

External links
 
Book review of Susan Emilson's, A Whiff of Heresy: Samuel Angus and the Presbyterian Church in New South Wales

1881 births
1943 deaths
Alumni of the University of Galway
Hartford Seminary faculty
Presbyterian Church of Australia
Australian Christian theologians
Academic staff of the University of Sydney
20th-century Christian theologians
Columbia University faculty
Princeton University alumni